Owais Amin Shah (born 14 October 1990) is an Indian cricketer who has played for Jammu and Kashmir in Indian domestic cricket. He is a left-handed batsman and left-arm leg spin bowler.

A former state under-19s player, Shah made his first-class debut for Jammu and Kashmir in December 2012, playing against Kerala in the 2012–13 Ranji Trophy. He played three Ranji Trophy matches in his debut season, and also appeared once in the 2012–13 Vijay Hazare Trophy (a limited-overs competition). In the 2013–14 Ranji Trophy, however, Shah appeared only once.

References

External links
Player profile and statistics at CricketArchive
Player profile and statistics at ESPNcricinfo

1990 births
Living people
Indian cricketers
Jammu and Kashmir cricketers
People from Srinagar